Anthony Ingruber (born 5 February 1990) is a Dutch-Australian actor and impressionist. Ingruber is best known for his role as John Doe/Joker in Batman: The Telltale Series and Batman: The Enemy Within as well as a young William Jones in the film The Age of Adaline.

Early life 
Anthony Ingruber was born on 5 February 1990 and grew up in Australia, New Zealand, Cyprus, the Netherlands and Canada. In Canada, Ingruber attended a drama school and used internet platforms like YouTube to publish his voice impressions.

Career 
Since 2006, Ingruber has played supporting roles in different TV series. In 2008, he uploaded videos on YouTube which included a Han Solo impression. He also had a very small extra part in James Cameron's Avatar as a technician and worked for Weta Workshop while he lived in New Zealand.

His first movie role was in the Disney TV movie Avalon High in 2010. Since then, Ingruber has appeared in a variety of work, including voice over and acting in industrial, independent, and feature films.

Anthony has become known on the Internet for his impressions of and uncanny resemblance to a young Harrison Ford, which helped him in winning the role of Young William, the young version of Ford's character, in the drama The Age of Adaline in 2015.

Filmography

Film

Television

Video games

References

External links
 

1990 births
Living people
Australian male film actors
Australian male television actors
Australian male video game actors
Australian male voice actors
Australian people of Dutch descent
Dutch male film actors
Dutch male television actors
Dutch male video game actors
Dutch male voice actors
Dutch people of Australian descent
Place of birth missing (living people)
21st-century Australian male actors
21st-century Dutch male actors